Art History, journal of the Association for Art History, is an international forum for peer-reviewed scholarship and innovative research. Founded in 1978, the journal publishes essays, critical reviews, and special issues that engage with path-breaking new developments and critical debate in current art-historical practice. Art History covers various genres of art and visual culture across all time periods and geographical areas. The journal welcomes contributions from the full spectrum of methodological perspectives, and it is a forum for a wide range of historical, critical, historiographical and theoretical forms of writing. By means of this expanded definition, Art History works to transform and to extend the modes of enquiry that shape the discipline.

References

External links
 

Wiley-Blackwell academic journals
Publications established in 1978
English-language journals
Art history journals
5 times per year journals